Divided Highway is a compilation album by American rock band The Doobie Brothers, released in 2003. (see 2003 in music). All tracks are taken from the albums Cycles (1989) and Brotherhood (1991).

Track listing
"Divided Highway" (Fox, Peterik, Simmons) – 3:51
"The Doctor" (Johnston, Midnight, Schwartz) – 3:46
"South of the Border" (Johnston) – 4:20
"Tonight I'm Coming Through (The Border)" (LaKind, McDonald) – 4:27
"Rollin' On" (Johnston) – 4:10
"Dangerous" (Simmons) – 5:03
"Take Me to the Highway" (Fedele, Midnight, Okerman, Simmons) – 3:16
"Our Love"  (Williams) – 4:28
"This Train I'm On" (Ockerman, Simmons) – 3:51
"Too High a Price" (Heron, Lakind, Zeke Zirngiebel) – 4:11
"Is Love Enough" (Richmond, Williams) – 4:38
"Showdown" (Johnston) – 4:14
"Something You Said" (Gorrie, Lunn) – 4:45
"Need a Little Taste of Love" (M. Isley, E. Isley, R. Isley, O. Isley, C. Jasper) – 4:01

References

External links
Divided Highway, Allmusic

The Doobie Brothers compilation albums
2003 compilation albums